Douglas Kary (born December 29, 1951) is a Republican member of the Montana Senate. He is whip for the Republican Senate. He was elected to the Montana Senate in 2015. From 2011 to 2015, Kary served in the Montana House of Representatives.

References

Living people
1951 births
Republican Party members of the Montana House of Representatives
Minot State University alumni
21st-century American politicians